Phyllis Tilson Piotrow (born 1933) is the founder and former first director of the Johns Hopkins University Center for Communication Programs.

Career and education 
Phyllis Tilson Piotrow graduated summa cum laude from Bryn Mawr College in 1954 with honors in history before going on to study at St Anne's College, Oxford as a Marshall Scholar. In 1956, she graduated Bachelor in Modern History with first class honours and Master of Arts in 1959.. From 1960 to 1965 she served as a Legislative Assistant to US Senator Kenneth B. Keating of New York.

In 1971 she became Doctor of Philosophy in Political Science and Population Dynamics from Johns Hopkins University in 1971. Piotrow founded the Center for Communication Programs at the Bloomberg School of Public Health at Johns Hopkins University and served as Director until 2001. She retired as a tenured professor. She had served for many years  as the founding Executive Director of Population Action International (PAI) as well as chairing the Population and Family Planning section of the American Public Health Association.

Piotrow has been a consultant to the United Nations, to the United States Agency for International Development (USAID) and to the US Government during the 1974 World Population Conference in Bucharest, Romania.

Publications 
 World Population: The Present And Future Crisis
 World Population Crisis: the United States' Response
 Six Billion People: Demographic Dilemmas and World Politics (with George P. Tapinos)
 Health Communication: Lessons from Family Planning and Reproductive Health (with D. Lawrence Kincaid, Jose G. Rimon)
 Strategies For Family Planning Promotion
 Family Planning: Improving Opportunities for Women

See also 
 D. Lawrence Kincaid

References 

1933 births
Living people
Johns Hopkins University faculty
People in public health
Alumni of the University of Oxford
Bryn Mawr College alumni